Volker Fischer (born 15 August 1950) is a German fencer. He won a gold medal and two silvers at three Olympic Games.

He keeps fencing in the Veterans category, with excellent results. For example, he won the World Veterans Championship at Debrecen in 2014.

References 

1950 births
Living people
German male fencers
People from Iserlohn
Sportspeople from Arnsberg (region)
Olympic fencers of West Germany
Fencers at the 1976 Summer Olympics
Fencers at the 1984 Summer Olympics
Fencers at the 1988 Summer Olympics
Olympic gold medalists for West Germany
Olympic silver medalists for West Germany
Olympic medalists in fencing
Medalists at the 1976 Summer Olympics
Medalists at the 1984 Summer Olympics
Medalists at the 1988 Summer Olympics